Latham Castle (February 27, 1900 – March 10, 1986) was a United States circuit judge of the United States Court of Appeals for the Seventh Circuit.

Education and career

Born in Sandwich, Illinois, Castle  was in the United States Army towards the end of World War I, in 1918, and then received a Bachelor of Laws from Northwestern University Pritzker School of Law in 1924. He was in private practice in Sandwich from 1924 to 1925, and was a city attorney of Sandwich from 1925 to 1928, becoming a corporation counsel of Sycamore, Illinois in 1928. He was then a state's attorney of DeKalb County, Illinois from 1928 to 1940, becoming an assistant state attorney general of Illinois from 1940 to 1942. He was a County judge for DeKalb County from 1942 to 1952, and was then the Illinois Attorney General from 1952 to 1959.

Personal

In May 1931, Latham married Georgiana Whitcomb, daughter of Mr. and Mrs. William Card Whitcomb who was the President of the Geo D. Whitcomb Company of Rochelle, Illinois.

Federal judicial service

On February 26, 1959, Castle was nominated by President Dwight D. Eisenhower to a seat on the United States Court of Appeals for the Seventh Circuit vacated by Judge Philip J. Finnegan. Castle was confirmed by the United States Senate on April 29, 1959, and received his commission on April 30, 1959. He served as Chief Judge from 1968 to 1970, assuming senior status on February 26, 1970, and serving in that capacity until his death on March 10, 1986.

References

Sources
 

1900 births
1986 deaths
Judges of the United States Court of Appeals for the Seventh Circuit
United States court of appeals judges appointed by Dwight D. Eisenhower
20th-century American judges
Illinois Attorneys General
Illinois state court judges
People from Sandwich, Illinois
United States Army soldiers
Northwestern University Pritzker School of Law alumni
20th-century American lawyers